Sarah Graley (born 3 October 1991) is a British cartoonist, best known for the ongoing webcomic, Our Super Adventure, and the Kim Reaper comic series. However, they are also known as one part of the band duo Sonic the Comic; they also livestream on their twitch channel named after their webcomic "our super adventure". They also have a podcast which is named after a twist on their webcomic "Our Super Podcast".

Career 
Graley graduated from the University of Wolverhampton with a BA (Hons) in Visual Communication (Illustration). During their studies, Graley started the webcomic series Our Super Adventure and self-published three small printed collections of comic strips between 2013 and 2015.

In 2012, Graley and their partner Stef Purenins formed a band of which they named Sonic The Comic. The band is still together and their last album, "Stabatha EP", was released in July 2016. Since the bands formation they have released many albums and singles, of which four are still available on the bands website. The bands albums where only ever released physically in an extremely limited quantity however can still be bought digitally at a "pay as you feel" price. The bands four available albums where titled: Pixel (November 1, 2013) Reveries EP, (August 5, 2014) Atoms, (May 4, 2015) Stabatha EP (July 4, 2016)  and where usually in a pop-punk style.

In 2015, Graley ran a Kickstarter project for a hardcover collection of 200 Our Super Adventure comics. It raised 450% of its goal. they self-published a shorter travelogue comic collection called Our Super American Adventure in 2017.

Their first published work was the Oni Press miniseries Rick and Morty: Lil' Poopy Superstar (2016), a five-issue spinoff of the main Rick and Morty comic series, of which Graley was the writer and illustrator.

Graley's original series Kim Reaper was released by Oni Press in 2017.

Their first middle grade novel Glitch was released by Scholastic Graphix in 2019.

They were the artist on the first official Minecraft graphic novel, Minecraft Vol. 1, which was published by Dark Horse Comics in 2019.

Their second middle grade novel Donut the Destroyer is due to be released by Scholastic Graphix in 2020.

Awards 
 2015 British Comic Awards nomination for Emerging Talent
 2016 Diamond Gem Award nomination for Best Licensed Comic of the Year
 2016 Diamond Gem Award nomination for Best New Comic Book Series

Bibliography

Graphic novels 
 Rick and Morty: Lil' Poopy Superstar (2017)
 Kim Reaper: Grim Beginnings (2018)
 Kim Reaper: Vampire Island (2019)
 Glitch (2019)
 Minecraft Vol. 1 (2019)
 Donut the Destroyer (2020)
 Minecraft Vol. 2 (2020)

Comic collections 
 Our Super Adventure (2015)
 Our Super American Adventure (2017)
 Our Super Adventure: Press Start To Begin (2019)
 Our Super Adventure: Video Games and Pizza Parties (2019)
 Our Super American Adventure: An Our Super Adventure Travelogue (2019)
 Our Super Canadian Adventure: An Our Super Adventure Travelogue (2019)
 Our Super Adventure Travelogue Collection: America and Canada (2019)
 Our Super Adventure: Cute! (2020)

Comic books 
 Invader Zim #26 (2017)

Other publications 
 Pizza Witch (2017)
 Pizza Witch: Deluxe Edition (2017)

References 

1991 births
Living people
21st-century British women artists
Alumni of the University of Wolverhampton
British cartoonists
British female comics artists
British webcomic creators
Artists from Northampton
Twitch (service) streamers